Athol Cerini (12 December 1907 – 10 April 1999) was an Australian rules footballer who played for the Essendon Football Club in the Victorian Football League (VFL).

Notes

External links 
		

1907 births
1999 deaths
Australian rules footballers from Victoria (Australia)
Essendon Football Club players